Yarimar Mercado Martínez (born March 12, 1995) is a Puerto Rican sports shooter. She competed in the women's 10 metre air rifle event at the 2016 Summer Olympics.

In April 2022, her mother was killed by a stray bullet in her Connecticut home while she was sewing.

References

External links
 

1995 births
Living people
Puerto Rican female sport shooters
Olympic shooters of Puerto Rico
Shooters at the 2016 Summer Olympics
People from Yauco, Puerto Rico
Pan American Games medalists in shooting
Pan American Games bronze medalists for Puerto Rico
Shooters at the 2015 Pan American Games
Medalists at the 2015 Pan American Games
Shooters at the 2020 Summer Olympics